Tristan Tsalikis Vukčević (born 11 March 2003), usually credited as Tristan Vukčević, is a Serbian-Swedish professional basketball player for Partizan Belgrade of the Serbian KLS, the Adriatic League and the EuroLeague.

Early life and youth career
Vukčević is the son of Jade and Dušan Vukčević. He was born in Siena, Italy as his father was playing for Montepaschi Siena. His father is a retired Bosnian-born Serbian professional basketball player who played for Crvena zvezda, Olympiacos, Real Madrid, Montepaschi, Olimpia Milano, Virtus Bologna, and others during his playing career as well as represented Serbia and Montenegro national team internationally. His mother Jade (née Cicak) is a Greek-based Swedish businesswoman and former swimwear model. Vukčević holds Serbian and Greek passport through his father, and a Swedish passport through his mother.

Vukčević grew up in Italy, where his father played professionally. Following Dušan's retirement, the family moved back to Athens, Greece. He started to play basketball for youth system of his father's former club Olympiacos. In 2018, Vukčević joined the U16 team of Spanish club Real Madrid, another father's former club. Vukčević won the Munich Tournament for the 2019–20 Euroleague NGT season with U18 Real Madrid. Over four tournament games, he averaged 16 points, 4.8 rebounds and 1.3 assists per game. Afterward, the Final Tournament was canceled due to the COVID-19 pandemic.

Professional career
On 2 September 2020, Vukčević made his pre-season debut for Real Madrid in a 68–66 win over Coosur Real Betis recording 8 points. On 11 October, he made his professional debut in a 90–65 win over Herbalife Gran Canaria recording 2 points and 2 rebounds in 4 minutes.

On 27 January 2022, Vukčević signed a multi-year contract with Partizan Belgrade of the ABA League.

National team career 
Due to his father's background, Vukčević is eligible to represent Greece, Bosnia and Herzegovina or Serbia internationally, while due to his mother's background he is eligible to represent Sweden. Also, he is eligible to represent Italy or Spain. According to his father, Vukčević decided to represent Serbia internationally.

Career statistics

Euroleague

|-
| style="text-align:left;"| 2020–21
| style="text-align:left;"| Real Madrid
| 3 || 1 || 9:09 || .750 || .000 || 1.00 || 1.7 || 0.0 ||  0.0 || 0.3 ||2.3 ||-1
|-
| style="text-align:left;"| 2021–22
| style="text-align:left;"| Real Madrid
| 9 || 1 || 6:34 || .500 || .333 || .500 || 1.2 || 0.2 || 0.0 || 0.2 || 2.1 || 1.6
|-
|- class="sortbottom"
| style="text-align:center;" colspan="2"| Career
| 12 || 2 ||   || .583 || .231 || .600 || 1.3 || 0.2 || 0.0 || 0.2 || 2.2 ||

Notes

References

External links
Tristan Vukcevic at acb.com
Tristan Vukcevic at euroleague.net
Player Profile 1 and Player Profile 2 at eurobasket.com
Tristan Vukcevic at serbiahoop.com
Tristan Vukcevic at nbadraft.net

2003 births
Living people
Greek expatriate basketball people in Serbia
Greek expatriate basketball people in Spain
Greek men's basketball players
Greek people of Bosnia and Herzegovina descent
Greek people of Serbian descent
Greek people of Swedish descent
KK Partizan players
Liga ACB players
Naturalized citizens of Greece
Real Madrid Baloncesto players
Serbian expatriate basketball people in Spain
Serbian men's basketball players
Serbian people of Bosnia and Herzegovina descent
Serbian people of Swedish descent
Swedish expatriate basketball people in Serbia
Swedish expatriate basketball people in Spain
Swedish men's basketball players
Swedish people of Bosnia and Herzegovina descent
Swedish people of Serbian descent
Sportspeople from Siena
Basketball players from Athens